Cylindera brendelliana is an extant species of tiger beetle in the genus Cylindera.

References

brendelliana
Beetles described in 1890